The Quebec Stock Savings Plan ( (RÉA)), was founded on March 27, 1979 by Jacques Parizeau, who was Minister of Finance at the time. The QSSP offered taxpayers generous tax write-offs for investments in new public stock issues of companies whose head office was in Quebec and was governed by the Quebec Taxation Act. Tax expenditures under
the QSSP amounted to nearly $1 billion from its beginning to its end. It was replaced by the SME Growth Stock Plan, now known as the Stock Savings Plan II, on April 22, 2005.

Goals 
 to alleviate the heavy tax load of Quebec's middle and high-income earners
 to finance Quebec companies with risk capital
 to acquaint Quebec's population at large with the stock market

References

Tax-advantaged savings plans in Canada
Economy of Quebec